Polystachya superposita is a species of flowering plant in the orchid family, Orchidaceae. It is native to Equatorial Guinea. It is also found in Cameroon, where it is thought to be an introduced species. This forest epiphyte is threatened by habitat destruction as forest land is cleared.

References

superposita
Orchids of Cameroon
Orchids of Equatorial Guinea
Endangered plants
Taxonomy articles created by Polbot